The list of national coordinate reference systems (CRS) lists map projections officially recommended for existing countries. Given that every projection gives deformations, each country's needs are different in order to reduce these distortions. These national projections, or national Coordinate Reference Systems are officially announced by the relevant national agencies. The list below is a collection of available official national projected Coordinate Reference Systems.

For Europe, recommendation are available for each country (Annoni & al. 2001:43-44), as well as for the European Union of 15, of 27, and of the larger geographic Europe (Annoni & al. 2001:16). 

The most important project collecting Coordinate Reference Systems is the EPSG Registry. These projections and frames are publicly available online on various sites.

Table

See also 
 List of map projections

References

Sources 
 
 
 
  (Download Shapefile 2012.11)

Map projections
Panorama photography